Greikoc (in Albanian) or Grejkovce is a village in the municipality of Suva Reka, in Kosovo. It is located in the district of Prizren. Greikoc lies in the region of Metohija (known in Albanian as Dukagjini). In the northeast and east, it is surrounded by the Šar Mountains, while in the west part, it extends all the way down to the plains. Farming is mainly primitive; fields are used to cultivate plants like wheat, corn or to collect hay, while pastures are used to raise and feed animals like cows, sheep, chickens, etc.

Notes

References 

Villages in Suva Reka

sr:Грејковце